Events from the year 1796 in Denmark.

Incumbents
 Monarch – Christian VII
 Prime minister – Andreas Peter Bernstorff

Events
 13 October – Hansen's Konditori

Births
 14 February – Poul Pagh, merchant and shipowner (died 1870)
 8 April – Frederik von Scholten, naval officer and painter (died 1853
 28 June – Caroline Amalie of Augustenburg, Queen of Denmark (died 1881)
 29 July – Christian Winther, lyric poet (died 1876)

Deaths
 12 April –  William Halling, landowner (born 1744)
 10 October – Queen Juliana Maria, Queen of Denmark (born 1729)

References

 
1790s in Denmark
Denmark
Years of the 18th century in Denmark